The Tokyo WCT was a men's tennis tournament played in Tokyo, Japan in 1972, 1973 and 1975. The event was part of the World Championship Tennis (WCT) circuit and was held on indoor carpet courts. The 1974 and 1975 editions were also known by their sponsored name Kawasaki Tennis Classic.

Finals

Singles

Doubles

References

External links
 ATP archive

 
Defunct tennis tournaments in Japan
World Championship Tennis
1972 establishments in Japan
1983 disestablishments in Japan